Mueang Nonthaburi is the capital district (amphoe mueang) of Nonthaburi province in Thailand. The city of Nonthaburi has 267,001 inhabitants, while the whole district has 348,553.

History
The district was originally named "Talat Khwan". Simon de la Loubère, who was a French envoy extraordinary to the King of Ayutthaya, wrote in his book that Talat Khwan (Talacoan) was an important place on the Chao Phraya River. It is unknown what year it was established. In 1917, the provincial administration of Nonthaburi was moved into the district, and thus the district was renamed Mueang Nonthaburi. From 1 January 1943 to 9 May 1946 Nonthaburi was abolished and split between Thonburi and Phra Nakhon Provinces. Thus the district, which was then in Phra Nakhon Province, was renamed "Nonthaburi". After the recreation of the province, it changed back to "Mueang Nonthaburi".

Administration
The district is divided into 10 sub-districts (tambons), which are further subdivided into 32 villages (mubans). The city (thesaban nakhon) of Nonthaburi covers tambons Suan Yai, Talat Khwan, Bang Khen, Bang Kraso, and Tha Sai. There are three town municipalities (thesaban mueang): Bang Si Mueang, which covers tambon Bang Si Mueang and parts of tambon Bang Krang; Sai Ma, which covers the tambon of the same name; and Bang Krang, which covers most parts of the tambon of the same name.

Economy
The Thai Department of Corrections has its headquarters in Suan Yai in this district.

References

External links
amphoe.com

Mueang Nonthaburi